José Alberto da Mota Barroso (born 26 August 1970) is a Portuguese former footballer who played as a defensive midfielder, and a current manager.

Over 14 seasons, he amassed Primeira Liga totals of 328 matches and 55 goals, mainly in representation of Braga (for eleven years).

Club career
Barroso was born in Braga. Armed with a powerful outside shot, he made his professional debut with hometown's S.C. Braga during the 1990–91 season, playing four games in the Primeira Liga. After a successful loan also in the north, with second level club Rio Ave FC, he returned, becoming an essential midfield element for the Minho side as well as their captain; in his last two years, although they finished tenth and eighth respectively, he scored a combined 14 league goals, mostly from long-range shots and/or free kicks.

Barroso then signed with FC Porto, winning two consecutive leagues although he would only be a fringe player in his second season, featuring in just nine matches out of 34. After one year with Académica de Coimbra he returned to Braga, now consolidated in the Portuguese top flight; he netted 13 times in his first two seasons, then added a career-best 12 goals in the 2002–03 campaign but the team could only rank in 14th place.

Barroso retired from football in summer 2005 at nearly 35, after helping Braga to two consecutive UEFA Cup qualifications, even though he contributed sparingly due to injuries.

Honours
Porto
Primeira Liga: 1996–97, 1997–98
Taça de Portugal: 1997–98
Supertaça Cândido de Oliveira: 1996

References

External links

1970 births
Living people
Sportspeople from Braga
Portuguese footballers
Association football midfielders
Primeira Liga players
Liga Portugal 2 players
Segunda Divisão players
S.C. Braga B players
S.C. Braga players
Rio Ave F.C. players
FC Porto players
Associação Académica de Coimbra – O.A.F. players
Portugal international footballers
Portuguese football managers